Prostanthera saxicola is a species of flowering plant in the family Lamiaceae and is endemic to eastern Australia. It is a shrub with linear to elliptic leaves and white to mauve flowers arranged in leaf axils.

Description
Flowering occurs between July and February.

Taxonomy
Prostanthera saxicola was first formally described in 1810 by Robert Brown in his treatise Prodromus Florae Novae Hollandiae et Insulae Van Diemen.

Four varieties have been described, the names accepted by the Australian Plant Census:

Distribution and habitat
This mintbush is widely distributed from south-eastern Queensland, through eastern New South Wales and in scattered places in Victoria. It grows in woodland and forest, and often in heath. Variety bracteolata, commonly known as slender mint-bush, is found in south-eastern Queensland and from the Pilliga forest to the Kanangra-Boyd National Park in New South Wales. It is the only variety occurring in Victoria. Variety major grows in heath in south-eastern Queensland and the Gibraltar Range National Park in New South Wales. Variety montana occurs in south-eastern New South Wales and var. saxicola in eastern New South Wales.

Conservation status in Queensland
Both varieties of P. saxicola (major and bracteolata) found in Queensland are listed as of "least concern" under the Queensland Government ''Nature Conservation Act 1992.

References

saxicola
Flora of New South Wales
Flora of Queensland
Flora of Victoria (Australia)
Lamiales of Australia
Plants described in 1810
Taxa named by Robert Brown (botanist, born 1773)